Visakhapatnam Special Economic Zone (VSEZ), also called the Andhra Pradesh First Economic Zone, is one of the central government special economic zones in India. VSEZ is located in Duvvada, 20 km away from the Visakhapatnam.

History
The zone originated in 1989, when it was named VEPZ (Visakhpatnam Export Processing Zone). It was changed to the Visakapatnam Special Economic Zone on 1 January 2003. The zone consists of an area of 360 acres. The Development Commissioner, the administrative head of the zone, is also the head of all 53 special economic zones in Andhra Pradesh, Chhattisgarh and the union territory of Yanam. From these SEZs, seven are multipurpose SEZs, and the remaining are sector specific SEZs.

Operation
VSEZ is treated as a foreign territory for trade operations, duties and tariffs. One hundred per cent foreign direct investment is allowed with permission for full and free repatriation of export proceeds. The turnover of the zone was Rs. 4.5 billion in 2004. Investments increased from Rs. 5.56 billion in 2008-09 to Rs. 12.4 billion in 2012-2013.

See also
 Andhra Pradesh Special Economic Zone
 Economy of Visakhapatnam

References

Industrial parks in India
Economy of Visakhapatnam
Special Economic Zones of India